Sir William Miller, Lord Glenlee, 2nd baronet of Glenlee, FRSE (1755-1846) was a Scottish advocate, law lord and landowner.

Life
He was born on 12 August 1755 the only son of Sir Thomas Miller, Lord Glenlee by his first wife, Margaret Murdoch. He was educated at the High School in Edinburgh then studied law at the University of Edinburgh. He passed the Scottish bar and became an advocate in 1777.

He was briefly the Member of Parliament for Edinburgh, 1780-1781, when he was unseated by a petition. He became Clerk of the Justiciary in 1783.

In 1783 he was a co-founder of the Royal Society of Edinburgh. He served as the Society's Vice President from 1816 until 1846. In 1789 on the death of his father, he inherited the baronetcy. In 1795 (already a baronet) he was given the title Lord Glenlee, as a law lord, the same title which his father had held.

His Edinburgh townhouse was at 17 Browns Square.

He retired in 1840 and died on 9 May 1846 at his country mansion at Barskimming. He is buried in a vault in the north-east corner of New Calton Burial Ground in Edinburgh.

Legal cases
At the age of 19, Miller played a part in the trial of John Reid, a case involving James Boswell. The trial was resolved by Miller's uncle, Patrick Miller, who was a judge.

In 1781 he also spoke in defence of Sir Hugh Palliser's appointment at Greenwich Hospital.

Family
In 1777 he married his cousin Grizel Chalmers, daughter of George Chalmers of Pittencrieff near Dunfermline, a wealthy grain merchant. Miss Chalmers was a noted singer at the Edinburgh Music Society based in St Cecilia's Hall.

Their three daughters and six sons included Grizel Martha, Martha Miller, John Miller of Stewartfield WS and Thomas Miller.

His uncle was Patrick Miller of Dalswinton. His second son Major William Miller of the Royal Horse Guards is buried in the New Calton vault with Lord Glenlee.

Artistic recognition
His portrait by William Walker is held in the Scottish National Portrait Gallery.

His caricature was also created by John Kay in 1799.

He was also sketched by Robert Scott Moncrieff around 1820.

References

1755 births
1846 deaths
19th-century Scottish judges
Alumni of the University of Edinburgh
Senators of the College of Justice
Founder Fellows of the Royal Society of Edinburgh
People educated at the Royal High School, Edinburgh
Members of the Faculty of Advocates
Scottish landowners
Politics of Edinburgh
Members of the Parliament of Great Britain for Scottish constituencies
Baronets in the Baronetage of Great Britain
Scottish knights
18th-century Scottish lawyers